Álvaro Luis Bernat Dalton (born February 13, 1975), known professionally as Tony Dalton, is a Mexican-American actor and screenwriter. For much of his career, he acted in Mexican films, television shows, and stage plays. 

He is best known in the United States for his portrayal of  Lalo Salamanca in Better Call Saul (2018–2022). He also starred as Jack Duquesne in the 2021 Marvel Cinematic Universe miniseries Hawkeye.

Early life
Álvaro Luis Bernat Dalton was born on February 13, 1975, in Laredo, Texas. He is the son of a Mexican father and an American mother and attended Eaglebrook School, a boarding school in Deerfield, Massachusetts. Dalton later studied acting at the Lee Strasberg Theatre and Film Institute in New York City.

Career

Dalton's first major role was on the Mexican telenovela Rebelde, an adaptation of the Argentine series Rebelde Way that ran from 2004 to 2006. His first film role was in Matando Cabos (2004), in which he starred and co-wrote the screenplay. He also acted in and wrote the script for Sultanes del Sur (2007). Dalton's other film credits include Love, Pain and Vice Versa (2008); and La Dictadura Perfecta (2014). 

Dalton played a supporting role in the 2008 HBO Latinoamérica series Capadocia. In 2017, he played the lead in the HBO series Sr. Ávila, which won the International Emmy award for Best Non-English Language Series. In 2018, Dalton landed the role of Lalo Salamanca in Better Call Saul, first appearing in the season 4 episode "Coushatta", and was promoted to the main cast for season 5 and season 6. In 2021, he was cast as Jack Duquesne in the Disney+ miniseries Hawkeye, set in the Marvel Cinematic Universe (MCU). He was cast after producer Trinh Tran was impressed with his performance in Better Call Saul.

Filmography

Film

Television

Theater
El año próximo a la misma hora (2009)
Juegos de poder (2017)

Awards and nominations

References

External links
 

1975 births
Living people
People from Laredo, Texas
American male film actors
Mexican male film actors
American male telenovela actors
Mexican male telenovela actors
American male actors of Mexican descent
Lee Strasberg Theatre and Film Institute alumni